Marius Stan (born 5 June 1957 in Hunedoara) is a former Romanian football player and former president of Oțelul Galați.  His tenure has seen the most successful period in the history of the club, with Oţelul securing both the Romanian title and the Supercupa României, both in 2011.

After finishing second during his first attempt in the 2008 local elections, he was elected Mayor of Galați in 2012 after receiving 48.7% of the votes.

Honours
Oțelul Galați
Liga II: 1985–86

Notes

References

External links
Marius Stan in Prosport
Marius Stan

1957 births
Living people
People from Hunedoara
Romanian footballers
Association football defenders
Liga I players
Liga II players
FCM Dunărea Galați players
ASC Oțelul Galați players
AFC Dacia Unirea Brăila players
Romanian sports executives and administrators
Romanian sportsperson-politicians